"Moments" is a song by Swedish singer and songwriter Tove Lo. It was released to American contemporary hit radio on 27 October 2015 through Republic Records. It serves as the fourth and final single from her debut studio album, Queen of the Clouds (2014).

Composition
"Moments" was written by Tove Lo, while its production was handled by Mattman and Robin. It is a synth-pop and electropop song, with elements of dark pop.

Music video
A music video for "Moments", directed by Tim Erem, was released on 21 October 2015. Natalie Weiner of Billboard wrote that "the video follows Tove Lo through a fairly wild (and intoxicated) night as she sings about her lovable imperfections." American duo singers Niki and Gabi released a cover version on April 29, 2016.

Release history

References

External links
 
 

2014 songs
2015 singles
Island Records singles
Republic Records singles
Songs written by Tove Lo
Tove Lo songs
Electropop songs
Synth-pop songs
Universal Music Group singles
Song recordings produced by Mattman & Robin